Mark Hessburg (born July 6, 1970) is a German musician, movie sound design artist and developer of Apps for the iPhone.

He was born in Kassel, Germany. In 1989 he started his music project Chassalla. Beside "Chassalla", Hessburg composed songs with Darrin Huss for the Canadian synthy pop band Psyche. From 1996 he worked in his "Green Hill - audio design" Studios with musicians like Hamid Baroudi, Mohamed Mounir, Hussaine Kili, Diego Jascalevich and Stephan Emig. Since 2002 he made Sound Design for several movies and television series.
His first iPhone App "SunGPS" was released November 26, 2009. On May 1, 2010 he released Newton's Dice 3D, a 3D dice game. His upcoming submarine simulation "WOTA" for the iPhone was announced on March 7, 2010 on the developers website.

See also

Chassalla

External links
 
 Newton's Dice 3D
 SunGPS
 Website

1970 births
Living people
German male musicians